The 2017 Idaho Vandals football team represented the University of Idaho in the 2017 NCAA Division I FBS football season. The Vandals played their home games at the Kibbie Dome in Moscow, Idaho, and competed in the Sun Belt Conference. They were led by fifth-year head coach Paul Petrino. They finished the season 4–8, 3–5 in Sun Belt play to finish in a tie for eighth place.

The season marked the Vandals' final year in the Sun Belt and the FBS, as the team rejoined the Big Sky Conference and FCS in 2018.

Previous season 
The Vandals finished the 2016 season 9–4, 6–2 in Sun Belt play to finish in tie for third place. They were invited to the Famous Idaho Potato Bowl where they defeated Colorado State.

Schedule
Idaho announced its football schedule on March 1, 2017 and the regular season consisted of six home games and six away games, with four each in the Sun Belt Conference. The Vandals hosted Appalachian State, Coastal Carolina, Louisiana–Lafayette, and Louisiana–Monroe, and traveled to Georgia State, New Mexico State, South Alabama, and Troy

The Vandals hosted two of the four non-conference opponents, Sacramento State from the Big Sky Conference and UNLV from the Mountain West Conference, and traveled to  Western Michigan from the Mid-American Conference and Missouri from the Southeastern Conference. 
 

Schedule Source:

Game summaries

Sacramento State

UNLV

at Western Michigan

at South Alabama

Louisiana–Lafayette

Appalachian State

at Missouri

Louisiana–Monroe

at Troy

Coastal Carolina

at New Mexico State

at Georgia State

References

Idaho
Idaho Vandals football seasons
Idaho Vandals football